AS Forces Armées, also known as ASFA, is a professional basketball team that is based in Senegal. They play in the Senegalese League. The team has won the Africa Clubs Championship three times, being behind only C.D. Primeiro de Agosto for most continental titles.

History
AS Forces Armées won the FIBA Africa Clubs Champions Cup three times, in the years 1975, 1979, and 1981. They also competed at the 1976 edition and the 1981 edition of the Intercontinental Cup.

Honours
FIBA Africa Clubs Champions Cup
Winners (3): 1975, 1979, 1981
Nationale 1
Winners (9): 1974, 1975, 1976, 1977, 1978, 1979, 1980, 1984, 1994, 1995
Senegalese Cup
Winners (9): 1975, 1977, 1979, 1980, 1984, 1987, 1992, 1994, 1995

References

External links
AfroBasket.com Team Page

Basketball teams in Senegal
Sport in Dakar